Commerce is a city in Jackson County, Georgia,  northeast of Atlanta. As of the 2020 census, the city had a population of 7,387.

History

Native American history 
Before European settlers arrived, the area around present-day Commerce was inhabited by the Creek and the Cherokee people.

The Lacoda Trail, which extended from present-day Athens to the north Georgia mountains, was a significant trade and travel route through this area. (Georgia State Route 334, which follows a  section of this ancient trail, was designated the "Lacoda Trail Memorial Parkway" by the Georgia General Assembly in 1998.)

Local histories that originated in the mid-1800s describe a territorial war between the Creeks and Cherokees over the land in the county during the 1770s. This war never occurred. The Cherokees were decisively defeated by the Koweta Creeks in 1754. For about a decade after their 1754 defeat, all Cherokee villages in the Georgia colony and the Hiwassee River valley in North Carolina were abandoned. William Bartram traveled through northeastern Georgia in 1773 and described the Creeks as being completely dominant over the Cherokees. The Cherokees never occupied or held title to lands within the boundaries of Jackson County.

The Creek Confederacy ceded its lands east of the Oconee River in 1785. A subsequent treaty in 1793 ceded the remainder of the land that was to become Jackson County. The last corridor of Creek land, located west of Jackson County, was ceded in 1818.

Early settlement

The first permanent white settlement in Jackson County began near present-day Commerce on January 20, 1784, when German immigrant William Dunson was awarded a land grant on Little Sandy Creek. The settlement was named "Groaning Rock", supposedly because of a nearby hollow rock formation that produced a moaning sound when the wind passed over it. (Descendants of William Dunson are still living on the original tract of land.)

A trading post was established by Eli Shankle near Groaning Rock in 1808, named "Harmony Grove". The common explanation is that the name is a play on his wife, Rebecca's, maiden name: Hargrove. There is also an old Appalachian hymn tune called "Harmony Grove", found in an 1830 book called The Virginia Harmony. This tune is popular today as the melody to "Amazing Grace".

The Harmony Grove Female Academy, the first all-female school chartered in the state of Georgia, was chartered by the state legislature on December 20, 1824.

The Harmony Grove post office was established on October 14, 1825; Russell Jones was its first postmaster.

On September 1, 1876, the North Eastern Railroad opened its line from Athens to Lula, which passed through the heart of Harmony Grove. The railroad line had the most significant impact on the shape of the city, which began expanding both directions along the line. These tracks are now owned by the Norfolk Southern Railway.

City history 
The Harmony Grove community was officially incorporated as a town on December 24, 1884, including all areas within a one-mile radius of the railroad depot, one half mile east, and 400 yards west.

Harmony Grove Mills, Inc. was organized under the laws of Jackson County on April 3, 1893, for the purpose of processing and producing cotton textiles. It served various purposes over the years, including the manufacture of denim overalls and the earliest production of electricity in the city. The mill village created to house employees makes up a significant portion of the homes on the southeast end of Commerce today. The mill had been in operation under various corporations until the spring of 2004, when it closed operations and was sold; it has been used for warehouse storage space since, and is currently for sale. The building is still a major feature of the city.

Near the end of the 19th century, many began to feel that the name "Harmony Grove" was too long to write and sounded too much like a country village. In addition, many didn't like the fact that mail frequently went to another post office by the same name in Dawson County. Harmony Grove was reincorporated and renamed "Commerce" on August 6, 1904, in an effort to address these concerns and reflect the city's commercial dominance in the north Georgia cotton trade.

In 1959, a series of controversial town hall meetings were held to try to convince members of the federal Interstate Highway System to re-route the proposed Interstate 85, originally planned to go through Gainesville (Hall County), through Commerce and Lavonia (Franklin County). The proposal was changed, and the interstate was routed through Jackson County. Even more so than the railroad nearly a century before, this major transportation artery brought tremendous commercial advantage to Commerce, at a time it desperately needed it.

Geography
Commerce is located in northeastern Jackson County at  (34.206520, -83.461203). Interstate 85 runs through the northern part of the city, with access from Exits 147 and 149. I-85 leads southwest  to Atlanta and northeast  to Greenville, South Carolina. U.S. Route 441 runs along the eastern border of Commerce, leading north  to Demorest and south  to Athens.

Commerce sits on a drainage divide between tributaries of the Oconee River to the southwest and tributaries of the Savannah River to the northeast.

Demographics

2020 census

As of the 2020 United States census, there were 7,387 people, 2,547 households, and 1,824 families residing in the city.

2000 census
As of the census of 2000, there were 5,292 people, 2,051 households, and 1,433 families residing in the city. The racial makeup of the city was 83.13% White, 14.74% African American (Black), 0.15% Native American, 0.49% Asian, 0.60% from other races, and 0.89% from two or more races. Hispanic or Latino of any race were 1.55% of the population.

There were 2,051 households, out of which 28.9% had children under the age of 18 living with them, 49.0% were married couples living together, 15.3% had a female householder with no husband present, and 30.1% were non-families. 26.3% of all households were made up of individuals, and 12.4% had someone living alone who was 65 years of age or older.  The average household size was 2.46 and the average family size was 2.94.

In the city, the population was spread out, with 22.6% under the age of 18, 9.0% from 18 to 24, 27.1% from 25 to 44, 22.7% from 45 to 64, and 18.6% who were 65 years of age or older.  The median age was 38 years. For every 100 females, there were 85.7 males.  For every 100 females age 18 and over, there were 80.6 males.

The median income for a household in the city was $33,897, and the median income for a family was $39,615. Males had a median income of $34,185 versus $22,028 for females. The per capita income for the city was $19,270.  About 10.2% of families and 12.7% of the population were below the poverty line, including 17.5% of those under age 18 and 26.1% of those age 65 or over.

For the population of persons aged 25 and over, 65.0% are at least high school graduates or an equivalent. Of these, 7.4% have a bachelor's degree and 3.5% have a graduate degree. The remainder, 35% of the adult population, lack a high school or equivalent diploma.

Education

Commerce City School District 
The Commerce City School District oversees public education for pre-school to grade twelve. It consists of two elementary schools (the primary school includes a pre-school program), a middle school and a high school. As of August 2010, district has 89 full-time teachers and over 1,358 students.
Commerce Primary School (pre-K through 2nd grade)
Commerce Elementary School (3rd and 4th grades)
Commerce Middle School (5th through 8th)
Commerce High School (9th through 12th)

Jackson County School District
Jackson County School District holds pre-school to grade twelve, and consists of six elementary schools, two middle schools, two high schools, and one charter school. As of December 2020, the district has a total of 8,611 students.
East Jackson Elementary School
Gum Springs Elementary School
Maysville Elementary School
North Jackson Elementary School
South Jackson Elementary School
West Jackson Elementary School
East Jackson Middle School
West Jackson Middle School
East Jackson Comprehensive High School
Jackson County Comprehensive High School
EMPOWER College and Career Center (Charter School)

Notable people

 Terry Allen, former football running back in the National Football League; born in Commerce
 Bill Anderson, country music singer, songwriter and television personality, famous for "City Lights"  written in Commerce; raised in Commerce
 Chris Beck, Major League Baseball pitcher for the Chicago White Sox
 Clay Hendrix, current head football coach at Furman University; born in Commerce
 Mike Bowers, former Attorney General of Georgia; born in Commerce
 Olive Ann Burns, award-winning author of Cold Sassy Tree, a novel loosely based on her experiences growing up in Commerce
 Spud Chandler, right-handed starting pitcher in major league baseball who played his entire career for the New York Yankees from 1937 through 1947; born in Commerce
 Lamartine G. Hardman, served two terms as the 65th governor of the state of Georgia from 1927 to 1931; born in Commerce
 Mary Hood, award-winning writer of predominantly Southern literature

References

External links
City of Commerce official website
The Jackson Herald
Commerce profile on Epodunk

Cities in Georgia (U.S. state)
Cities in Jackson County, Georgia
1784 establishments in Georgia (U.S. state)